The 1916 United States presidential election in New Jersey took place on November 7, 1916. All contemporary 48 states were part of the 1916 United States presidential election. Voters chose 14 electors to the Electoral College, which selected the president and vice president.

New Jersey was won by the Republican nominees, U.S. Supreme Court Justice Charles Evans Hughes of New York and his running mate, former Vice President Charles W. Fairbanks of Indiana. Hughes and Fairbanks defeated the Democratic nominees, incumbent President Woodrow Wilson of New Jersey and his running mate incumbent Vice President Thomas R. Marshall of Indiana.

Hughes carried New Jersey decisively with 54.40 percent of the vote to Wilson's 42.68 percent, a victory margin of 11.72 points. Coming in a distant third was Socialist candidate Allan L. Benson, who took 2.10 percent.

Like much of the Northeast, New Jersey in this era was a staunchly Republican state, having not given a majority of the vote to a Democratic presidential candidate since 1892. However, in 1912, Woodrow Wilson, then the sitting Governor of New Jersey, had won the state's electoral votes, but with a plurality of only 41 percent in a 3-way race against a split Republican field, with former Republican President Theodore Roosevelt running as a third party candidate against incumbent Republican President William Howard Taft. However, with the Republican base re-united behind Charles Evans Hughes in 1916, Wilson lost his home state to the GOP by a decisive 12-point margin in a head-to-head match-up, despite having served as the state's governor.

On the county level map, reflecting his comfortable victory, Hughes carried 17 of the state's 21 counties, breaking sixty percent of the vote in three.

Wilson's only significant win was urban Hudson County, while he also won the three rural counties in western North Jersey, Warren, Sussex, and Hunterdon, which had long been non-Yankee Democratic enclaves in the otherwise Republican Northeast. Warren and Hunterdon had never voted Republican as of 1916 – and Sussex only for William McKinley in 1896 – yet Wilson would prove the last Democrat to win Sussex County until Lyndon Johnson in 1964.

Despite being Wilson's home state, New Jersey registered as the second most Republican state in the nation in terms of vote share after Vermont and the fourth most Republican state in the nation in terms of margin, the state being about 15 points more Republican than the national average.  Woodrow Wilson is one of 4 presidents to lose his home state on a successful presidential bid. The others are James K. Polk, Richard Nixon, and Donald Trump.

Results

Results by county

See also
 Presidency of Woodrow Wilson
 United States presidential elections in New Jersey

References

New Jersey
1916
1916 New Jersey elections